Appian Corporation is a cloud computing and enterprise software company headquartered in McLean, Virginia, part of the Dulles Technology Corridor. The company sells a platform as a service (PaaS) for building enterprise software applications. It is focused on low-code development, process mining, business process management, and case management markets in North America, Europe, the Middle East and Southeast Asia.

History

Founding and early growth: 1999–2013 
Appian was founded in 1999 by Michael Beckley, Robert Kramer, Marc Wilson and Matthew Calkins, who serves as CEO.

In 2001, the company developed Army Knowledge Online, regarded at the time as “the world's largest intranet." 

In 2005, the company expanded into financial services and other private markets. It became known for its low-code platform.

In 2010, Appian Cloud was accredited with Federal Information Security Management Act (FISMA) low-level security by the U.S. Education Department. In 2013, it received FISMA Moderate Authorization and Accreditation from the General Services Administration (GSA).

Secondary investments and NASDAQ: 2014–2017 
In 2014, the company received $37.5 million in secondary investments from New Enterprise Associates, which was paid out to shareholders. In 2015, transportation company Ryder began using the Appian apps instead of paper processing during the checkout process and internally for truck maintenance records.

In 2016, Vontobel, a global investment firm, started using Appian's Low-Code Platform to improve its business processes.

On May 25, 2017, Appian became a publicly-traded company, trading as APPN on the NASDAQ Global Exchange.

Process mining and artificial intelligence: 2018–present 
In May 2019, Appian released Appian AI, enabling artificial intelligence capabilities on its platform.  In March 2020, the company updated the platform's Artificial intelligence and robotic process automation capabilities. In 2021, the company was named a leader in Digital Process Automation software by Forrester.

In 2022, Appian started highlighting the importance of low-code tools in improving environmental, social & corporate governance (ESG). The company stressed that embedding these tools within operational processes makes it easier for companies to integrate ESG data sources, adapt to regulations, and remain in control of auditability.

In February, the company secured provisional authorization from the Defense Information Systems Agency to allow its low-code platform-as-a-service “to handle Impact Level 5 controlled unclassified information and national security systems”. This lets defense customers use Appian Government Cloud as well as the Appian Low-Code Platform.

In March, Horizon Power, a Western Australian energy utility, wanted to transfer from manual process to automation and started using Appian’s low-code platform to improve internal workflows and processes.

April 2022, process mining, first available in January, was fully integrated into all Appian products. This resulted in process mining, low-code/no-code workflows, and automation working as a single solution. That same month, Appian started the free #lowcode4all program to help provide access to low-code education and certification for developers. Participants complete a low-code curriculum and the Appian Certified Associate Developer exam, receive access to hiring recruiters through Appian’s partner network, and get job search skills support. The program targeted undergraduate and graduate students, students who had paused their education, unemployed, career-changers, and military veterans. 

In May 2022, Appian was awarded $2.04 billion in damages against Pegasystems Inc. Pegasystems was found guilty of hiring a developer to spy on Appian, stealing trade secrets in an operation Pegasystems referred to as "Project Crush." Pega is appealing the verdict and the company will not be required to begin paying the judgment until all avenues of appeal have been exhausted.  In February 2023, Pega filed an appeal asking the court to overturn the previous judgement and either rule in Pega’s favor or order a new trial.

Acquisitions 
On January 7, 2020, Appian announced acquisition of Novayre Solutions SL, developer of the Jidoka robotic process automation (RPA) platform.

In August 2021, Appian acquired the process mining company Lana Labs. The company's applications help companies discover the work patterns being used within their organization by looking through system logs for common actions and sequences.

Services

Low-code platform 
Appian offers a low-code platform with a visual interface and pre-built development modules. As of August 2020, it was the only pure-play provider of low-code software on the stock market. As with other low-code platforms, it enables businesses to create apps and automations using little or no code. The platform protects privacy and security with its HIPAA-compliant cloud. The platform includes Appian AI and Appian RPA.

SAIL (Self-Assembling Interface Layer) 
Appian SAIL technology is a low-code method for enterprise applications that works from back-end integration to upper level graphical user interfaces. It also incorporates Appian’s AI Intelligent Document Processing (IDP) tool.

Appian Portals 
This allows designers to use low-code to build and manage secure external websites that capture and share data from Appian applications.

Process Mining 
Process mining is the act of analyzing, improving, and monitoring business processes. In April 2022, process mining was fully integrated into the Appian platform. Appian uses process mining to identify any business inefficiencies, then uses low-code to draw a visual representation of a more efficient workflow, and follows up with a second round of process mining after implementation to make sure that the new process has solved the problem 

Appian includes the Mine Process history plug-in that lets users automatically import process data into the process mining product for further analysis. It also includes a no-code module.

Pre-built apps 
Appian also sells pre-built frameworks. In late 2020, it launched apps to support businesses with COVID-19 concerns. They track workforce health and safety during the COVID-19 pandemic, collecting information from employees and storing it in a HIPAA-compliant cloud, help organizations reopen their offices, and helps banks manage Paycheck Protection Program loan applications, including AI-powered intelligent document processing. Another app, created in partnership with the University of South Florida, helps educational campuses collect COVID-19 related data about individuals and coordinate health and safety guidelines in academic communities to plan for students returning to campus. The firm also developed apps that facilitate return-to-work protocols, and a framework for government organizations to manage acquisition processes, institutional onboarding, and intelligent document processing.

Data Fabric 
In 2021, Appian announced plans for a low-code data product. It was completed in April 2022 and was named Appian Data Fabric. It unifies data from enterprise systems, reducing the time to deliver new applications.

See also 

 Business process automation
 Business process management
 Low-code development platform
 No-code development platform

References 

Information technology companies of the United States
Cloud computing providers
Cloud applications
Enterprise software
Business process management
2017 initial public offerings
Companies listed on the Nasdaq
Companies based in McLean, Virginia